The 1986 Independence Bowl was a college football postseason bowl game between the Ole Miss Rebels and the Texas Tech Red Raiders.

Background
The Rebels finished tied for 2nd in the Southeastern Conference in their first bowl game since 1983, which was also in the Independence Bowl. David McWilliams left Texas Tech for the University of Texas prior to the bowl game, leaving the job to Spike Dykes in the first bowl game for the Red Raiders since 1977.

Game summary

First quarter
Ole Miss: Willie Goodloe 1 run (Owen kick) – 7-0 Ole Miss

Second quarter
Ole Miss: Joe Mickles 9 run (Owen kick) – 14-0 Ole Miss
Ole Miss: Owen 21 field goal – 17-0 Ole Miss
Texas Tech: James Gray 1 run (Segrist kick) – 17-7 Ole Miss

Third quarter
Texas Tech: Merv Scurlark 33 interception return (Segrist kick) – 17-14 Ole Miss

Fourth quarter
Texas Tech: Segrist 19 field goal – 17-17 tie
Ole Miss: Owen 48 field goal – 20-17 Ole Miss

Aftermath
Dykes remained the Red Raiders head coach until 1999, reaching six more bowl games, with the last being against Ole Miss, in 1998. Ole Miss reached four more bowl games with Brewer before he was fired in 1993.

Statistics

References

Independence Bowl
Independence Bowl
Ole Miss Rebels football bowl games
Texas Tech Red Raiders football bowl games
Independence Bowl
December 1986 sports events in the United States